Coles Corner is a small unincorporated community in Chelan County, Washington, United States.  It is located on Highway 2 east of Stevens Pass in the Cascade Mountains, at the junction for SR 207. It is just north of the town of Winton.

Coles Corner primarily services travelers along Route 2, with a motel, a gas station, and the 59er Diner, a 1950s-style diner visited by Guy Fieri.

Populated places in Chelan County, Washington